The 25th MOBO Awards were held on 30 November 2022 at the  Wembley Arena in London, to recognize achievements in "music of black origin" during 2022. The ceremony was hosted by internet personalities Chunkz and Yung Filly, and was live-streamed through YouTube.

The nominees were announced on 11 November 2022, introducing two new categories, Best Alternative Music Act and Best Electronic/Dance Act. For the first time, the Album of the Year award was given to two artists, Little Simz and Knucks. British music entrepreneur Jamal Edwards received the Paving the Way Award as a posthumous honour to recognize his contributions in helping various artists to launch their careers.

Performers
The performers were announced on 17 November 2022.

Winners and nominees
The nominees were announced on 11 November 2022. The winners are listed first and in bold.

Special awards
Lifetime Achievement Award
 Nile Rodgers

Outstanding Contribution Award
 Craig David

Paving The Way Award
 Jamal Edwards

References

External links
Official site

British music awards
2022 awards in the United Kingdom